Bahrami (also Romanized as Bahrāmī; also known as Badrābād-e ‘Olyā and Badrābād-e Bālā) is a village in Koregah-e Gharbi Rural District, in the Central District of Khorramabad County, Lorestan Province, Iran. At the 2006 census, its population was 3,728, in 772 families.

References 

Towns and villages in Khorramabad County